Edwin Jock Perry is a New Zealand politician. He was a New Zealand First Member of Parliament from 2002 to 2005.

Member of Parliament

He was first elected to Parliament as a list MP in the 2002 election, having also stood in the Wairarapa electorate. He formerly held office in the National Party's organisational wing. Before entering politics, he worked in marketing. He lost his seat in the 2005 election.

References

Living people
Māori MPs
New Zealand First MPs
Year of birth missing (living people)
People from Masterton
New Zealand list MPs
Unsuccessful candidates in the 2011 New Zealand general election
Members of the New Zealand House of Representatives
Unsuccessful candidates in the 1999 New Zealand general election
Unsuccessful candidates in the 2005 New Zealand general election
Unsuccessful candidates in the 2008 New Zealand general election
Unsuccessful candidates in the 2014 New Zealand general election
New Zealand National Party politicians
21st-century New Zealand politicians